KISS MY ANKH: A Tribute To Vinnie Vincent is a 2008 tribute album, featuring a variety of artists covering songs written (or co-written) by Vinnie Vincent. The album consists of new recordings of songs from Vincent's careers with Kiss and the Vinnie Vincent Invasion. Featured artists include Steve Brown of Trixter, Troy Patrick Farrell of White Lion, T.J. Racer of Nitro, Sheldon Tarsha of Adler's Appetite, Chris Caffery of Savatage and Trans-Siberian Orchestra, Ryan Roxie from the Alice Cooper band and rock & roll comic C.C. Banana, who performs a parody of the Kiss song "Unholy" (rewritten as a roast of Danger Danger vocalist Ted Poley).

Track listing

Name
The album title is a play on words, combining the phrase "kiss my ass" (also the name of a Kiss tribute album) with a reference to the Egyptian nature of Vinnie Vincent's Kiss character (who wore a golden ankh symbol on his face).

References

External links
KISS MY ANKH homepage
KISS MY ANKH song samples at MySpace
KISS MY ANKH entry at Kiss Related Recordings

2008 compilation albums
Kiss (band) tribute albums